The 1964 NHL Amateur Draft was the second NHL Entry Draft. It was a draft to assign unaffiliated amateur junior-age players to NHL teams. It was held at the Queen Elizabeth Hotel in Montreal, Quebec.

As was the case in the 1963 draft, amateur players turning 17 years of age between August 1, 1964, and July 31, 1965, were eligible, if they were not already sponsored by an NHL club.

The order of the draft followed the agreement reached in 1963, where the order was fixed as Red Wings, Bruins, Rangers, Black Hawks, Maple Leafs and Canadiens. Once again each team received four picks, each team having the right to forfeit their selection and pass it to the next team in the order. All picks were exercised this year.

Of the 24 players selected only nine played in the NHL. Syl Apps, Jr., Jim Dorey, Tim Ecclestone and Mike Pelyk went on to have fruitful NHL careers, each playing well over 200 games a piece. However, the steal of this draft was the Bruins' third pick, 14th overall: Ken Dryden. Dryden made it known to the Bruins that he would elect to play at Cornell University, earning a Bachelor of Arts degree, instead of turning professional. The Bruins traded his negotiation rights to the Canadiens, where he would play seven full seasons and part of an eighth, earning a Conn Smythe Trophy, Calder Memorial Trophy, five Vezina Trophies, five All-Star Game appearances, five First All-Star awards and six Stanley Cups.

Selections by round
Below are listed the selections in the 1964 NHL amateur draft.

Round one

Round two

Round three

Round four

See also
 1964–65 NHL season
 List of NHL players

References

External links
 1964 NHL Amateur Draft on hockeydraftcentral.com
 1964 NHL amateur draft player stats at The Internet Hockey Database

Draft
National Hockey League Entry Draft